DMG Entertainment is a global entertainment and media company. The studio's most recognizable films include Looper (2012), Iron Man 3 (2013)  and Bloodshot (2020).

History
Founded by Filmmaker Dan Mintz and Producer Bing Wu, DMG started in commercial production for such brands as Volkswagen, Budweiser, and J&J, etc. winning awards. They later grew a full-service advertising agency which included strategy, creative development, media placement, live events, and digital.

In 2012 DMG would start co-producing and financing major motion pictures with Tri-Star, Sony and Marvel Studios. Their first picture Looper (Director Rian Johnson), starring Bruce Willis, Joseph Gordon Levitt and Emily Blunt, would generate 177 million dollars on a 30 million dollar budget.

After Looper, DMG would go on to produce Iron Man 3 with Marvel Studios, directed by Shane Black and starring Robert Downey Jr., Don Cheadle, Gwenyneth Paltrow, Guy Pierce and Jon Favreau) which would later become the most successful of all the Iron Man movies grossing over $1.2 billion in worldwide box office revenue.

DMG would then go on to produce Transcendence (starring Johnny Depp – Warner Brothers), Point Break (Warner Brothers), Chappaquiddick, Collide (Anthony Hopkins, Nicholas Holt, Felicity Jones, and Ben Kingsley), Blockers (Leslie Mann- Universal Pictures) and Bloodshot (Vin Diesel – Sony Pictures) .

DMG Interactive
In 2017, DMG Entertainment launched DMG VR, a new division focused on immersive storytelling. As part of a new project, DMG introduced Arcturus, a DMG subsidiary firm developing interactive VR technologies.

In 2016 DMG also acquired the VR rights to Hasbro’s Transformers franchise, a live-action attraction and a theme park for Transformers Universe featuring its most notable characters Optimus Prime and Bumble Bee in an interactive environment using VR technologies. The first "digital theme park" opened in spring 2017 in Shanghai.

Valiant Entertainment
DMG Entertainment was majority shareholder of the books and comics publisher Valiant Comics since 2014, allowing it to have a significant impact on the company's recent development.

Following the full acquisition of comic publisher Valiant Entertainment in 2018, DMG added two new divisions - Books & Comics and Video Games, that gave DMG control over Valliant's interactive library, the third largest Universe of over 2,000 superhero characters including “X-O Manowar” and “Bloodshot”.

In September 2019, it was announced that Paramount Pictures announced they would produce the Harbinger movie from with Neal Moritz and Dan Mintz attached as producers.

DMG’s Valiant Entertainment most recently produced Bloodshot with Sony Pictures.

Filmography

Twilight (2008) – theatrical distribution (China)
The Founding of a Republic (2009) – co-production
Knowing (2009) – theatrical distribution (China)
Go Lala Go! (2010) – co-production
Killers (2010) – theatrical distribution (China)
RED (2010) – theatrical distribution (China)
Resident Evil: Afterlife (2011) – theatrical distribution (China)
The Eagle (2011) – theatrical distribution (China)
Beginning of the Great Revival (2011) – co-production
Love You You (2011) – co-production
Priest (2011) – theatrical distribution (China)
Repeat I Love You (2012) – co-production
Looper (2012) – co-production, theatrical distribution (China)
Iron Man 3 (2013) – co-production
No Man's Land (2013) – co-production
Transcendence (2014) – co-production, theatrical distribution (China)
Point Break (2015) – co-production, theatrical distribution (China)
Collide (2015) – co-production
Terminator 2 3D (2016) – theatrical distribution (China)
Father Figures (2017) – co-production
Blockers (2018) – co-production
Playmobil: The Movie (2019) – co-production
Bloodshot (2020) – co-production

References

External links

  DMG-Interactive

Film distributors of China
Mass media companies established in 1994
Film production companies of China
Chinese companies established in 1994